Walter L. Smith Jr. (December 17, 1917 – July 10, 1994) was an American Republican politician who served in the New Jersey General Assembly from 1964 to 1971 and in the New Jersey Senate from 1971 to 1972.

While in the Legislature, he was a strong opponent to the state income tax and the raising of the sales tax.

He was married to Alice H. Smith and was the father of future State Senator Bradford S. Smith.

References

1917 births
1994 deaths
Republican Party members of the New Jersey General Assembly
Republican Party New Jersey state senators
People from Cinnaminson Township, New Jersey
20th-century American politicians